Doyle Road Bridge is a covered bridge spanning Mill Creek in Jefferson Township, Ashtabula County, Ohio, United States. The bridge, one of 16 drivable bridges in the county, is a single span Town truss design, with laminated arches added during its renovation in 1987.

History
1868 – Bridge constructed.
1987 – Bridge renovated.
Mill Creek which the bridge crosses is named after the Mills family, early pioneer settlers to the area.

Dimensions
Length: 
Overhead clearance:

Photo

See also
List of Ashtabula County covered bridges

References

External links
Ohio Covered bridges list
Ohio Covered bridge homepage
Covered bridge numbering system
Ohio Historic Bridge Association
Doyle Road covered bridge from Ohio Covered Bridges, Historic Bridges

Covered bridges in Ashtabula County, Ohio
Bridges completed in 1868
Road bridges in Ohio
Wooden bridges in Ohio
Lattice truss bridges in the United States
1868 establishments in Ohio